Chalga Sar (also Romanized as Chalgā Sar; also known as Chālkā Sar, Chalkāser, Chilkasar, and Chilkassar) is a village in Dasht-e Veyl Rural District, Rahmatabad and Blukat District, Rudbar County, Gilan Province, Iran. At the 2006 census, its population was 603, in 144 families.

References 

Populated places in Rudbar County